Players and pairs who neither have high enough rankings nor receive wild cards may participate in a qualifying tournament held one week before the annual Wimbledon Tennis Championships.

Seeds

  Chip Hooper (qualified)
  Mark Kratzmann (qualified)
  Bill Scanlon (qualifying competition, lucky loser)
  Marko Ostoja (first round)
  Peter Fleming (first round)
  Brad Drewett (qualifying competition)
  Michael Robertson (qualified)
  Jay Lapidus (qualified)
  Larry Stefanki (qualifying competition)
  Shahar Perkiss (second round)
  Gary Muller (first round, retired)
  Ken Flach (qualified)
  Marc Flur (qualified)
  Jim Gurfein (first round)
  Tim Gullikson (second round)
  Brad Pearce (qualified)
  Thomas Högstedt (qualifying competition)
  João Soares (qualifying competition)
  Peter Carlsson (first round)
  Lloyd Bourne (first round)
  Tomm Warneke (qualifying competition)
  Tom Cain (qualifying competition)
  Dácio Campos (first round)
  Shlomo Glickstein (qualified)
  Gary Donnelly (qualifying competition)
  Andy Kohlberg (second round)
  Kevin Moir (qualified)
  Mike Bauer (qualified)
  Christo van Rensburg (qualified)
  Roberto Saad (first round)
  Leo Palin (first round)
  Bill Cowan (first round)

Qualifiers

  Chip Hooper
  Mark Kratzmann
  Christo van Rensburg
  Brian Levine
  Kevin Moir
  Mike Bauer
  Michael Robertson
  Jay Lapidus
  Shlomo Glickstein
  Alexander Zverev
  Christian Saceanu
  Ken Flach
  Marc Flur
  Brett Custer
  Paul Chamberlin
  Brad Pearce

Lucky loser
  Bill Scanlon

Qualifying draw

First qualifier

Second qualifier

Third qualifier

Fourth qualifier

Fifth qualifier

Sixth qualifier

Seventh qualifier

Eighth qualifier

Ninth qualifier

Tenth qualifier

Eleventh qualifier

Twelfth qualifier

Thirteenth qualifier

Fourteenth qualifier

Fifteenth qualifier

Sixteenth qualifier

External links

 1986 Wimbledon Championships – Men's draws and results at the International Tennis Federation

Men's Singles Qualifying
Wimbledon Championship by year – Men's singles qualifying